The MG 17 was a 7.92 mm machine gun produced by Rheinmetall-Borsig for use at fixed mountings in many World War II Luftwaffe aircraft, typically as forward-firing offensive armament. The MG 17 was based on the older MG 30 light machine gun, as was its defensive flexible-mount counterpart, the MG 15 machine gun.

History 
A mainstay fixed machine gun in German built aircraft (many of which were sold to other countries) well before World War II, by 1940 it was starting to be replaced with heavier caliber machine gun and cannons. By 1945 very few if any aircraft mounted the MG 17.

The MG 17 was installed in the Messerschmitt Bf 109, Messerschmitt Bf 110, Focke-Wulf Fw 190, Junkers Ju 87, Junkers Ju 88C Nightfighter, Heinkel He 111,  Dornier Do 17/215 Nightfighter, Focke-Wulf Fw 189 and many other aircraft. Many MG 17s were later modified for infantry use, as the Luftwaffe replaced them with the heavier-calibre MG 131, which replaced both the MG 15 in bomber defense applications and the MG 17 as the standard fighter's forward-firing offensive armament (unless the machine guns were replaced by autocannons, such as the MG 151/20, altogether). Official numbers of conversions was about 24,271 by January 1, 1944, although additional conversions may have been done as well.

Modifications to the design included removal of the buttstock, switching from magazine to belt-fed ammunition, and from open-bolt operation to closed bolt operation, to allow it to be installed in synchronized applications, firing through the propeller arc. The MG 15 retained open bolt operation, but used 75 round saddle-type drum magazines, and likewise lost its buttstock, to fit better in the tight confines of an aircraft. The MG 30 was also the basis for the famed MG 34 and MG 42 designs; variants of the latter are still in service in certain areas.

Specifications
Calibre: 7.9 +/- .04 mm
Cartridge: 7.92×57mm IS
Round weight: 35.5 grams (cartridge 24 grams, bullet 11.5 grams)
Muzzle velocity: from 885 m/s (Phosphor "B" round ) to 905 m/s (Armor Piercing Tracer "SmK L'spur" round)
Rate of fire: 1200 rpm
Dimensions
Length: 	1175 mm
Weight: 	10.2 kg
Action: 	Recoil
Feed system: 	Belt magazine
Sights 	Remotely located, various types

References

See also
Browning M1919
Vickers VGO
Lewis gun/Type 92 machine gun
Type 1/Type 98 machine gun (MG 15)
Type 89 machine gun
List of firearms
List of uncommon World War II weapons

MG 017 machine gun
7.92×57mm Mauser machine guns
World War II infantry weapons of Germany
World War II machine guns
Machine guns of Germany
Rheinmetall
Military equipment introduced in the 1930s